João Bernardo Vieira II, born in Bissau on August 17, 1977 is the Secretary of State for Transport and Communications of Guinea-Bissau and the spokesperson of the biggest party in Guinea-Bissau.

Early life and education
João Bernardo Vieira was named after his uncle João Bernardo Vieira who served as President of Guinea-Bissau from 1980 to 1998 and later 2005 to 2009. Vieira has a law degree from Universidade Lusídas Lisboa, Portugal and holds a master's degree in Sustainable International Development from Brandeis University, where he served as President of the Graduate Students Association. He was awarded a certificate of Emerging Leaders Program in Executive Education from Harvard Kennedy School and an Archbishop Desmond Tutu Leadership Fellowship in South Africa.

Career
In 2004, Vieira began his career in public service in Guinea-Bissau by serving as the Head of Multilateral Agreements in the Ministry of Trade. In this capacity he represented Guinea-Bissau in the multilateral trade negotiations of the World Trade Organization.

He took courses in Geneva offered to students from Least Developed Countries. In 2011 after a national contest, he was selected out of a pool of 50 Bissau-Guineeans to serve as a member of the board of National Regulatory Authority, an organization responsible to regulate the telecom and the internet sector where he served for 3 years.

Secretary of State for Transport and Communications

In May 2014 he contributed to party's landslide victory. In July he was sworn in as Secretary of State for Transport and Communications, the youngest member (Kodé) of the government.

Gallery

References

External links 

1977 births
Living people
Brandeis University alumni
Government ministers of Guinea-Bissau
People from Bissau